was a samurai, Gōzoku during Muromachi Period in Ezo. Morosue was also known as "Andō Hachiro Morosue", as well as "Sigebetsu Shimoguni Shikibu Morosue". He was the grandson of Andō Iemasa, although his father is unknown. His seishitsu was Kakizaki Suehiro's daughter.

According to "Shinra no kiroku", Morosue's grandfather, Lemasa, was the Lord of Shigebetsu castle and one of the Ezo shugos. However, one theory is Andō Sadasue, not Morosue, was the only shugo ruler of Ezo.

In Eiroku 5 (1562), due to Ainu attacks, Morosue lost Shigebetsu castle and escaped to Matsumae and was ordained as "Jōkan". As family trees show, Morosue and his son (Shimoguni Shigesue) were on bad terms, so he moved to Setanai.

After Morosue's death, his son Shigesue took over the family estate. After Shigesue's death, Yoshisue (Shigesue's younger brother's son) took over the family estate and became Karō of Matsumae domain (Shimoguni clan).

Notes

References

Year of birth unknown
Year of death unknown
Samurai
Karō